Beki Luiza Bahar (December 16, 1926 - August 19, 2011) was a Turkish-Jewish writer and playwright.

She is Turkey's first known female Jewish playwright. Best known for her historical creations, her plays were staged by the General Directorate of State Theaters and many theater companies in Turkey.

Apart from her plays, she wrote poetry, essays, research and her memoirs. She published articles in many newspapers and magazines of Turkey. Her best-known works are Efsaneden Tarihe Ankara Yahudileri (The Jews of Ankara from Legend to History) and Altmış Yılın Ardından (After Sixty Years) in which she compiled her memories. Besides Turkish, she also wrote poems in Ladino.

Biography
Bahar was born in Istanbul on December 16, 1926, to Sara Benbiçaçi and Jak Morhayim. She attended the Beyoğlu Jewish School in Istanbul. When her family moved to Ankara in 1937 due to her father's job, she completed her education at the TED Ankara Koleji. She studied law at the University of Istanbul, but did not complete her studies.

She got married in 1948 to the businessman Jojo Yusuf Bahar and had two daughters, Sara and Roza, and a son, İzzet.

Career
From 1958, her essays, research, travel notes and poems began to be published in many magazines and newspapers. After her first article was published in Haftanın Sesi in 1958, her first poem was published in the Varlık Anthology of New Poems (Yeni Şiirler Antolojisi) in 1959, and her first short story was published in the magazine Çağdaş in 1964. Her first play, " Albora ", was staged by Haldun Taner at the Ankara State Theater in 1970.

She returned to Istanbul with her family in 1980. Once there, she continued to publish articles in the Jewish newspaper Şalom as well as the Turkey-based magazines Eflatun, Tiryaki, Konya Çağrı, and Göztepe, as well as on Gelişim and other publications published by Turkish immigrants to Israel. For the 500th anniversary of the Alhambra Decree and the subsequent Expulsion of Jews from Spain, she wrote the poem Azan, Çan, Hazan, better known as Boğaz'da Ortaköy'de (In Ortaköy-on-the-Bosphorus), which was engraved and placed on a plaque in the Ortaköy Pier Square on April 26, 1992, after the poem being read by the mayor of Ortaköy. The words "Azan, Çan Hazan" became very popular, and eventually became the title of a documentary series. The Turkish composer Ali Kocatepe wrote a song named "Azan, Çan Hazan".

Her play "Senyora Grasya Nasi", dedicated to Grasia Mendes Nasi earned her the Yunus Emre Achievement Award of the Bakırköy Municipality in 1995; it was translated into French in 2001. Her play Ölümsüz Kullar (Pudu-Hepa) (Immortal slaves) entered the repertoire of the State Theater in 1997; but has not yet been put on stage. Some of her unpublished plays have been staged in Jewish community centers in Istanbul. Some of the articles she wrote during forty years in various publications were compiled under the name of Ne Kendi Tanır Ne de Söz Edeni Vardır (Neither she Knows or talks), which was published as a book in 2000.

Death
Bahar passed away in 2011. She was buried in the Ulus Ashkenazi Jewish Cemetery due to the overpopulation of the Ulus Sephardi Jewish Cemetery, located 500 meters away, in Arnavutköy.

Works

Poems
Yakamozlar (1963)
Kişi Bunalımı+Dişi Bunalımı (1970)
Doğada Düğün (1989)
Koronas (2002) (in Ladino)

Plays
Ölümsüz Kullar (Pudu-Hepa, 1973)
İkiyüzbininci Gece (1986)
İkizler, (1986)
Sıradan Bir Şey (1984)
Donna Grasya Nasi (1993)

Essays
Efsaneden Tarihe: Ankara Yahudileri (2003)
Bir zamanlar Çıfıt Çarşısı (2010)

Unpublished plays
Balat'tan Bronx'a (musical)
Bir Bütün
Alabora

Memories
Ordan Burdan Altmış Yılın Adından (1995)

Anthology
Ne Kendi Tanır Ne de Söz Edeni Vardır (2000)

References

1926 births
2011 deaths
Women dramatists and playwrights
Turkish dramatists and playwrights
Turkish Sephardi Jews
Jewish women writers
Judaeo-Spanish-language poets